Kampen Church is a church in the neighborhood of Kampen in Oslo, Norway.   The church was consecrated 29 November 1882.  After a fire in Kampen in 1878, plans for the reconstruction of the neighborhood included a new church.  In 1880 it was founded a new congregation, that was located elsewhere until the church was finished.

The church is made of brick and has 480 seats. The architect for the church was Jacob Wilhelm Nordan.  The church tower is covered with copper sheet. The altarpiece of the church shows two women at the empty grave of Jesus on Easter morning and was created in 1884 by the Norwegian painter and sculptor Axel Ender and was restored in 1913.  Above four of the church's interior doors there are symbols of the four Gospels conducted by Enevold Thømt in 1913.  The church is adorned with twelve large and six small stained glass windows and two rosette windows of the front doors, created by Peer Lorentz Dahl.  The Madonna sculpture in marble (located in the Church porch) is created by sculptor Knut Steen in 1992.

The church is listed and protected by law by the Norwegian Directorate for Cultural Heritage.

Gallery

References

External links 

 Official website 
 Kampen Church Visit Oslo, Official travel guide to Oslo

Lutheran churches in Oslo
Churches completed in 1882
1882 establishments in Norway
19th-century Church of Norway church buildings